The Mato Grosso antbird (Cercomacra melanaria) is a species of bird in the family Thamnophilidae. It is found in Bolivia, Brazil, and Paraguay. Its natural habitats are subtropical or tropical dry forests and subtropical or tropical moist lowland forests.

The female has similar white fringes and white tail tips but is gray above and paler gray below.

Taxonomy
The Mato Grosso antbird was formally described in 1835 by the French zoologist Édouard Ménétries under the binomial name Formicivora melanaria.
The specific epithet is from Latin melania meaning "blackness". The type locality is the town of Cuiabá in the Brazilian state of Mato Grosso. This antbird is now placed in the genus Cercomacra that was introduced by the English zoologist Philip Sclater in 1858. The species is monotypic: no subspecies are recognised.

References

Mato Grosso antbird
Birds of Bolivia
Birds of the Pantanal
Mato Grosso antbird
Taxonomy articles created by Polbot